James Street is a Lower City arterial road in Hamilton, Ontario, Canada. It starts off at the base of the Niagara Escarpment from James Mountain Road, a mountain-access road in the city. It was one of many arterials in the central business district converted to one-way operation in 1956 when the city retained Wilbur Smith and Associates to develop a Traffic and Transportation Plan. Parts of it were restored to two-way operation in 2002. It extends north to the city's waterfront at the North End where it ends at Guise Street West right in front of the Harbour West Marina Complex and the Royal Hamilton Yacht Club.

History

James Street was named after one of Nathaniel Hughson's sons. Hughson was one of the city founders of Hamilton along with George Hamilton and James Durand. Originally, James Street was called Lake Road because it was the road that led to Lake Ontario to the north. Then it was renamed to Jarvis Street after city founder George Hamilton's wife (Maria Jarvis) and then finally changed to its present-day James.

George Hamilton, a settler and local politician, established a town site in the northern portion of Barton Township after the war in 1815. He kept several east–west roads which were originally Indian trails, but the north–south streets were on a regular grid pattern. Streets were designated "East" or "West" if they crossed James Street or Highway 6. Streets were designated "North" or "South" if they crossed King Street or Highway 8.

James Street was the Lake Road and in 1835, James Street was extended south, but was interrupted by a bog at Hunter Street which eventually (1844) was drained out and graded.

Hugh Cossart Baker Sr. established the first life insurance company in Canada 21 August 1847; the Canada Life Assurance Company. The firm was incorporated in 1849. The first head office was in Hamilton, Ontario on the top floor of the Mechanics' Institute on James Street near Merrick, where Hamilton City Centre now stands. The head office remained in Hamilton until 1900, when the new president George Cox moved it to Toronto.

In 1872, the Bank of Hamilton was established. It had its head offices at the corner of King and James Streets and lasted until 1924. The Bank of Hamilton merged with The Commerce (later to become the Canadian Imperial Bank of Commerce, or CIBC) on January 2, 1924. It was one of the last surviving banks in Canada that was not headquartered in Toronto or Montreal.

On June 20, 1877, the first commercial telephone service in Canada began in Hamilton, Ontario. Hugh Cossart Baker Jr. learned of Alexander Graham Bell's invention in 1877 at the Philadelphia International Exposition and from there decided to test the communication tool in Hamilton. Hugh Cossart Baker Jr. is credited with making the first telephone exchange in the British Empire from an office building at the corner of James and Main Street East which still stands there today (March 2007).

In 1890, the first Bowling alley in the City opens at back of the J.W. MacDonald Tobacco shop, (66 James Street North).

Architecture

In 1929, the Pigott Building was built for $1,000,000. Originally an office building, the Pigott Building is now used for condominiums. The Lister Block building on the corner of James and King William Street was the first indoor commercial mall in Canada. In 1961, the old city hall, with its 38-metre clock tower was demolished to allow expansion of Eaton's department store. The clock and bell went into the tower of the 1990 Eaton Centre, now known as the Hamilton City Centre. In 1973, the Birks Building, at King and James was once described by Oscar Wilde as "the most beautiful building in all of North America." In 2000, LIUNA Station reopened the James Street North Canadian National rail station as a banquet hall. In 1996 the station was used for the most expensive film ever made in Canada to that time, The Long Kiss Goodnight, which cost $95 million USD to make. In 2000, X-Men shot some of its scenes at LIUNA Station.

The Bank of Montreal building (corner of James & Main Streets) had its cornerstone laid on 8 August 1928 and was completed 18 June 1929. At the time, the bank's directors were quoted in the local papers as saying; "This building is evidence of the Bank of Montreal's faith in Hamilton's future and Hamilton's growing importance as one of the leading commercial and industrial centres in Canada." An impressive structure with a cathedral-like interior was designed by Kenneth G. Rea and built by the local Pigott Construction Company. In 1972, the Bank of Montreal vacated the building when they moved to the then-new Bank of Montreal Pavilion (now known as 1 James Street North), but the following year the Hamilton Public Library used it as a reference library. In September 1980, the building was vacated again and was used a couple times thereafter as a night club, (Monopoli and The Syndicate). It was then renovated afterwards and today it is home to a National Law Firm office.

The Federal Building on James Street North was built in 1856. It was first home to a post office which eventually moved to the corner of King and John Streets. It was then the temporary site of the Hamilton City Hall between 1888 and 1890 while the new structure on the corner of James and Market Streets was being built. In 1897, the Sun-Life Assurance Company totally renovated it for their own district offices. In 1920, it went through another major renovation which saw the addition of two more storeys. Currently it is home to the Hamilton City Ballet which takes up the entire top (5th) floor and the rest of the building is used up as residential apartments.

One can reach the Bruce Trail via James Street South. The trail cuts through the city along the Niagara Escarpment (mountain) and used by many locals for a full day's hike. Hikers are led to scenic gorges, hidden waterfalls and places of quiet charm.

Lister Block building
The Lister Block, first built in 1886, was destroyed by fire in 1923 and the second building was erected in 1924. The original building built in 1886 only had four floors. It was the first indoor commercial mall in Canada and is currently owned by LIUNA - Laborers' International Union of North America. The building one time was also home for the local Oldies 1150 CKOC radio station which has been on the air since May 1, 1922 and as of the year 2000 is the oldest radio station in English Canada, second oldest overall.

The Lister Block is named for Joseph Lister, the original owner, who was a merchant, clothier, member of the city's Board of Water Commissioners and school trustee. His goal was to build a "most modern and central accommodation" for small merchants at modest rent.

It was the centre of community life in Hamilton for much of the last century. It was built with excellent materials and workmanship during prosperous times in the city before stock markets crashed in 1929. One of the few buildings of its type in Ontario west of Toronto, its style is more frequently seen in American Great Lakes cities.

In 2004, the then-abandoned Lister Block was used as a filming site for a music video for the song Home by Canadian rock band Three Days Grace.

James North Art District

Growth in the arts and culture sector has garnered high level media attention for Hamilton. A 2006 article in The Globe and Mail, entitled "Go West, Young Artist," focused on the growing art scene in Hamilton. The second Friday of every month there's a James North Art Crawl where people experience many flavours of art and stroll the lively sidewalks and savour the tastes of nearby cafes and restaurants. Artist studios, such as that of indigenous fashion designer Angela DeMontigny, are also open for browsing. The Factory: Hamilton Media Arts Centre, opened up a new home on James Street North in 2006. Art galleries are springing up on many streets across the city: James Street, King William Street, Locke Street and King Street, to name a few. This, coupled with growth in the Downtown condo market which is drawing people back to the Core, is having a strong, positive impact on the cultural fabric of the city. The opening of the Downtown Arts Centre on Rebecca Street has spurred further creative activities in the Core. The Community Centre for Media Arts (CCMA) continues to operate in Downtown Hamilton. The CCMA works with marginalized populations and combines new media services such as website development, graphic design, video, and information technology, with arts education and skills development programming.

The Hammertheatre Company, founded in January 2007, is a company devoted to theatre research in Hamilton and also devoted to the plays of artistic director Sky Gilbert whose plays will deal with issues of gender and sexuality. Gilbert is also the founder of legendary Toronto theatre, Buddies in Bad Times. There, Gilbert's iconic gay plays found an enthusiastic, vast audience. The theatre is at the old Ancient Order of Foresters building in the James Street North neighbourhood where Hamilton's Art scene continues to grow and where Sky has been living since 2004.

Museum
 
On Friday October 26, 2007 a new Museum opened up on James Street North near Cannon called, Hamilton HIStory + HERitage, the future of the past. The owner Graham J. Crawford shares the story of Hamilton in a multimedia exhibition space celebrating the lives of the men & women who have helped to shape the city. The space is also available for special meetings, presentations, book launches and school visits. There is no charge for the exhibitions. The museum's first presentation topic was that of James Street North and based on the works of local Hamilton historian Bill Manson which includes historical musical videos.

Time Capsule

A time capsule was buried beneath a marker on the north-east corner of James & Wilson Streets on Wednesday November 16, 1988 by the Jamesville Business Community under the aegis of the city's Business Improvement Area (B.I.A.) programme. It commemorates the completion of the James Street North streetscape project (1986–1988), which marked the renaissance of this historic link between the Hamilton Harbour and the City Centre.

James Street has always been the focal point for new Canadians arriving in Hamilton, first by ship from overseas docking at the foot of James Street, later by train at the CN Railway Station. The first arrivals were English, Scottish and Irish; later came Italian and German; more recently Portuguese and then Greek. All in their turn have added to the cultural richness of the street. The capsule is to be opened on Tuesday, November 16, 2038, by the mayor, alderman and business Leaders of James Street North on that future day.

It was a bright, warm, Indian summer afternoon when the capsule was buried; It is hoped it will be the same when the capsule is raised 50 years hence. Those that were in attendance in 1988 when the time capsule was buried include Bob Morrow (mayor), Sidney H. Leon (president of the Jamesville B.I.A.), Jerry Sherman (vice president of Jamesville B.I.A.), Vince Agro (alderman Ward 2), Filipe M. Vianna (treasurer) and William M. McCulloch (alderman Ward 2).

Transportation
In 1931, trains no longer blocked traffic as the James Street underpass was completed. (3 December 1931).

Westend incline railway

James Street, at the base of the Niagara Escarpment (mountain) was the site of the city's first Incline railway (1892–1932). Back then, the Incline railway on James Street was known as the Hamilton & Barton Incline Railway. It connected to present day Upper James Street. The city's second Incline railway on Wentworth Street South, (1895–1936), was known as the Eastend Incline Railway but was often called, The Mount Hamilton Incline Railway. The Eastend Incline on Wentworth Street was electrically operated and the Westend Incline on James Street depended on steam for its power. The west end lincline closed in 1932 and tracks removed and all that remains is a trail of the old railway.

In 1924, following the city's booming development in the east, there was some serious discussion regarding the addition of a third incline railway. The 2 locations be considered at the time were Sherman Avenue or Ottawa Street South. The population of Hamilton Mountain at the time was 6,000.

In 1929, the city's brochures were using the motto, "The City Beautiful and Hub of Canadian Highways" as well as "The City of Opportunity". In regards to the Incline railways, the brochures go on to boast, "There is no finer view anywhere on the North American continent than the panorama to be seen from the Hamilton mountain. The city below, the blue waters of Hamilton harbour and Lake Ontario. In the background, flanked on the east by the famous Niagara Fruit District and on the west by the beautiful Dundas Valley and a range of hills, combine to make a picture no artist could paint. There are several roads leading up to the summit and you can drive upon "high", but if you want to enjoy a unique experience and give the family a thrill, drive your car onto one of the Incline Railways and you will have something to tell the folks about when you go back home."

Waterfront Shuttle

The Waterfront Shuttle is a free service offered by the Hamilton Street Railway. It has a seasonal schedule that runs weekends from May-to-October connecting Hamilton's downtown core to the waterfront and attractions that can be found there like HMCS Haida and the Parks Canada Discovery Centre. The route circles Hamilton's downtown core around York Boulevard (north), Bay Street South (west), King Street West (south) and James Street North (east). Then it travels north along James Street and the Art District until it reaches the waterfront at Guise Street past the Royal Hamilton Yacht Club, Hamilton Chamber of Commerce and the Harbour West Marina Complex. Then the route hangs a left on Discovery Drive, the site of the Parks Canada Discovery Centre. Also at this site is the Hamilton Harbour Queen (cruise boat), Hamiltonian (tour boat) and the Hamilton Waterfront Trolley.

Waterfront Trolley
The Hamilton Waterfront Trolley is a narrated tour along the 12 kilometre Hamilton Waterfront Trail. The main stop and departure spot is at the Hamilton Waterfront SCOOPS Ice Cream parlour, which provides the famous Stoney Creek Dairy Ice Cream. There are a dozen stops along the way between Princess Point at the western-end of the route to the eastern-end, the site of HMCS Haida. Also near this eastern-end route is the site of the Hamiltonian Tour Boat, which is a 12-passenger tour boat that offers a leisurely guided tour of Hamilton harbour with the captain providing interesting stories and history of one of North America's most noteworthy harbours. In addition to this there is also the Hamilton Harbour Queen Cruises which is another ship that offers 3-hour tour of the harbour along with Lunch, Dinner or other special events like Dance parties. This Harbour Queen Cruise was also the 2005 winner of the Hamilton Tourism Awards for "best tourism idea."

Images

See also
Chateau Royale (Hamilton, Ontario)
Niagara Escarpment Commission

References

MapArt Golden Horseshoe Atlas - Page 647 - Grids H12, G12, F12, E12

External links

James Street North Art District
Downtown Hamilton
Durand neighbourhood Association
North End Neighbours
Bruce Trail Association
Hikes on the Bruce Trail
The Studios at Hotel Hamilton

Roads in Hamilton, Ontario